One Shocking Moment is a 1965 American film directed by Ted V. Mikels. It was his third feature as director and was a sexploitation film.

Plot
A young newlywed couple move to the city and get involved in the fast life.

Cast
Gary Kent (as Phillip Brady) as Cliff
Lee Anna as Mindy
Verné Martine as Tanya
Maureen Gaffney as Joanie 
Jerry Fitzpatrick as Rick
Victor Izay (as Victor Sandor) as D.G. Brenner

Production
The film was made under the title A Suburban Affair. Mikels made it for a theatre in Phoenix and says the film "set some records where it played". The movie is one of the few in Mikels career to feature nudity and  sex scenes. “I grew up with a sense of  morality," he later said. "I grew up a Catholic. I didn’t want to put sex in my films."

References

External links

One Shocking Moment at TCMDB
One Shocking Moment at Letterbox DVD
One Shocking Moment at BFI

1965 films
1965 drama films
American sexploitation films
Films directed by Ted V. Mikels
1960s American films